The Golden Orpheus (Zlatniyat Orfey) was an international song contest, held annually from 1965 to 1999 in Sunny Beach, Bulgaria. Alongside its Bulgarian pop song competition, the festival’s rules and regulations included an international singing contest. The event quickly grew to be one of the most prestigious Eastern European festivals during socialism.

Selected winners of the Grand Prix 
 1971: Maria Pakhomenko (USSR)
 1974: Lili Ivanova (Bulgaria)
 1975: Alla Pugachova (USSR)
 1976: Farah Maria (CUBA)
 1977: Roza Rymbayeva (USSR)
 1981: Dagmar Frederic (GDR)
 1984: Debbie Campbell (USA)
 1988:Tamara Gverdtsiteli (USSR)
 1990: Etta Scollo (Austria)
 1992: Henry Winter (Ireland)

Selected first prize winners 
 1968: Marion Rung (Finland)
 1970: Biser Kirov (Bulgaria)
 1971: Omara Portuondo (Cuba) and Ben Cramer (The Netherlands), (shared) 
 1973: Sofia Rotaru (USSR)
 1974: Sergei Zakharov (USSR)
1974:Nereyda Naranjo (Cuba)
 1975: Lee Towers (Netherlands)
 1976: Enzo Gusman (Malta)
 1979: Albert Asadullin (USSR)
 1980: Valery Leontiev (USSR)
 1981:Argelia Fragoso (Cuba)
 1986: Albita Rodriguez (Cuba)
 1988:Marusha (Cuba)
 1992:  Henry Winter (Ireland)

Selected second prize winners 
 1969: Yuri Bogatikov (USSR)
 1975:Elizabeth de Gracia (Cuba)
 1976: Eugene Martynov (USSR)
 1992: Philipp Kirkorov (Russia)

Selected third prize winners 
 1968: Joseph Kobzon (USSR)
 1972: Lev Leshchenko (USSR)
 1982:Miguel Chávez (Cuba)
 1984:María de Jesus (Cuba)

Notable interval act performers 
 Ornella Vanoni – 1969
 Josephine Baker – 1970
 Gilbert Bécaud – 1971
 Salvatore Adamo - 1972
 Rosita Fornes  -1972
 Gianni Morandi - 1973
 Ricchi e Poveri - 1973
 Julio Iglesias - 1973
 Karel Gott – 1974, 1986
 Al Bano and Romina Power – 1975, 1984
Iva Zanicchi-1976
 Alla Pugacheva - 1976, 1982, 1986, 1995
 Grupo Irakere - 1976.
 Eruption - 1979
 Farah Maria -1981
 Tina Turner - 1982
 Mungo Jerry - 1987
 Paco de Lucía - 1988
 Boney M. - 1990
 Toto Cutugno - 1993
 Boy George - 1994
 La Toya Jackson - 1994
 Demis Roussos - 1995
 The Temptations - 1995
 Paul Rodgers - 1995
 Alannah Myles - 1996
 2 Unlimited - 1996
 Philipp Kirkorov - 1998

References

External links

Music festivals in Bulgaria
Song contests
Singing competitions
Recurring events established in 1965
1965 establishments in Bulgaria
Recurring events disestablished in 1999
Music festivals established in 1965
Music competitions in Bulgaria